The 2009–10 Alabama–Huntsville Chargers ice hockey team represented the University of Alabama in Huntsville in the 2009–10 NCAA Division I men's ice hockey season. The Chargers were coached by Danton Cole who was in his third season as head coach. His assistant coaches were Chris Luongo and John McCabe. The Chargers played their home games in the Von Braun Center, and were a member of College Hockey America.

The 2009–10 season marked the final season for men's hockey as part of College Hockey America; Niagara University and Robert Morris University moved to Atlantic Hockey, and Bemidji State moved to the WCHA for the 2010–11 season. With the CHA folding, UAH applied for admission to the Central Collegiate Hockey Association (CCHA). On August 11, the CCHA announced that UAH's application to become a member of the conference was denied. Following the 2009–10 season, UAH will play as the only Division I Independent program due to the lack of conference affiliation.

After a 30-game regular season, the Chargers finished with 10 wins, 17 losses, and 3 ties.  Highlights came from a road upset of then-fifth ranked Notre Dame in the first game of the season, and a consolation win at the Catamount Cup in January.  The team finished third in the CHA, with 6 wins, 10 losses, and 2 ties.  At the 2010 CHA men's ice hockey tournament in Lewiston, New York, the Chargers defeated Robert Morris in the first round, and then defeated Niagara, 3–2, in overtime to win the conference title and secure a trip to the NCAA Tournament.  In the NCAA Northwest Regional, the Chargers lost to No. 1 ranked Miami (OH), 2–1.

Roster

|}

Season

Schedule
  Green background indicates win (2 points).
  Red background indicates loss (0 points).
  Yellow background indicates tie (1 point).

|-
!colspan=12 style=""| Regular season

|-
!colspan=12 style=""| CHA Tournament

|-
!colspan=12 style=""| NCAA Tournament

Standings

Statistics

Skaters

Goaltenders

Awards
 2010 College Hockey America Champions
 2010 CHA Tournament MVP: Cameron Talbot
 2010 CHA All-Tournament Team: Cody Campbell, Cameron Talbot

References

Alabama–Huntsville Chargers men's ice hockey seasons
Alabama Huntsville